Kusti may refer to:
 Kosti, Sudan, major city in Sudan
 Kushti, sacred girdle worn by Zoroastrians
 Pehlwani, a South Asian form of wrestling, also known as kusti or kushti
 Kusti, male given name
 Kusti Arhama (1885–1957), Finnish farmer and politician